Mount Maria is a volcanic cone mountain located at the Tawau Division of Sabah, Malaysia.

Geology 
The mountain is formed through the late Pleistocene volcanisms which contributed to the prominent topographic features of the Semporna Peninsula and its surrounding areas. Together with Mount Lucia in the Tawau volcanic field, the mountains are made up of Pleistocene dacites. The surrounding mountain peak has been reported with the potential of generating renewable energy such as geothermal power.

History 
Since 1979, it has been a part of Tawau Hills Park. Jungle trekking activities are served by the park where the forest trail also leads to Mount Lucia and Mount Magdalena.

See also 
 List of volcanoes in Malaysia

References 

Tawau Division
Mountains of Sabah
Mount Maria
Mount Maria
Volcanoes of Malaysia
Extinct volcanoes